Leucopogon assimilis is a species of flowering plant in the family Ericaceae and is endemic to the south of Western Australia. It is an erect, slender shrub with linear or lance-shaped leaves and pink to white, tube-shaped flowers.

Description
The flowers are arranged in short, dense spikes near the ends of branches or in upper leaf axils with bracts and bracteoles about as long as the sepals. Flowering occurs from August to November.

Taxonomy
Leucopogon assimilis was first formally described in 1810 by Robert Brown in Prodromus Florae Novae Hollandiae et Insulae Van Diemen. The specific epithet (assimilis) means "similar".

Distribution and habitat
This leucopogon grows on coastal dunes, ridges and slopes in near-coastal areas of southern Western Australia between Cape Naturaliste and Cape Arid National Park in the Esperance Plains, Jarrah Forest and Mallee bioregions of southern Western Australia.

Conservation status
Leucopogon apiculatus is listed as "not threatened" by the Government of Western Australia Department of Biodiversity, Conservation and Attractions.

References

assimilis
Ericales of Australia
Flora of Western Australia
Plants described in 1810
Taxa named by Robert Brown (botanist, born 1773)